André Legrand (1896–1986) was a French screenwriter and occasional film producer.

Selected filmography
 The Man from Niger (1940)
 Night in December (1940)
 Happy Days (1941)
 Miss Bonaparte (1942)
 La Symphonie fantastique (1942)
 Shop Girls of Paris (1943)
 Dark Sunday (1948)
 Dance of Fire (1949)
 The Red Needle (1951)
 At the Order of the Czar (1954)
 Hungarian Rhapsody (1954)
 Tabarin (1958)
 Hardi Pardaillan! (1964)
 Nick Carter va tout casser (1964)

References

Bibliography
 Goble, Alan. The Complete Index to Literary Sources in Film. Walter de Gruyter, 1999.

External links

1896 births
1986 deaths
French film producers
20th-century French screenwriters
Film people from Paris